The Düsseldorf Open was a women's professional tennis tournament held for one year, in 1973, in Düsseldorf, West Germany. Its one year on the WTA Tour saw a home player, Helga Masthoff, triumphing in the women's singles, whilst she and Heide Orth reached a women's doubles final that was never played.

Finals

Singles

Doubles

See also
 Düsseldorf Grand Prix
 ATP Düsseldorf Open

References
WTA Tour history

Defunct tennis tournaments in Germany
WTA Tour
Sport in Düsseldorf
Tourist attractions in Düsseldorf
History of Düsseldorf